Springfield College is a private college in Springfield, Massachusetts. It confers undergraduate and graduate degrees.
It is known as the birthplace of basketball because the sport was invented there in 1891 by Canadian-American instructor James Naismith. The college's philosophy of "humanics... calls for the education of the whole person—in spirit, mind, and body—for leadership in service to others."

History 
Founded in 1885, as the Young Men's Christian Association department of the School for Christian Workers in Springfield, the school originally specialized in preparing young men to become General Secretaries of YMCA organizations in a two-year program. In 1887, it added a Physical (i.e., physical education) department. In 1890, it separated from the School for Christian Workers and became the YMCA Training School and in 1891, the International Young Men's Christian Association Training School.

In 1905, the school became a degree-granting institution.

In 1912, it took the name International YMCA College and in 1954, Springfield College.

Archives 
Since 1999, the college archives have included archival material from the Society of Health and Physical Educators, various of its affiliates, and the papers of their leaders.

Presidents
Springfield College has had 13 leaders:

Academics
Springfield College offers bachelor's degrees in more than 40 majors, master's degrees in a variety of different fields, and doctoral programs in counseling psychology, physical therapy, and physical education. The student-to-faculty member ratio is 11 to 1.

The college comprises four schools. The School of Arts and Sciences grants degrees in the liberal arts, science, business, and education, including 59 undergraduate majors and concentrations and eight graduate programs.

The School of Physical Education, Performance, and Sport Leadership offers undergraduate and graduate programs in health and wellness occupations, including applied exercise science, nutritional science, athletic training, physical education and health education, recreation management, and sport management. It is a member of the American Kinesiology Association. It incorporates the Springfield College East Campus outdoor learning center.

Organized in 2005, the School of Health Sciences offers undergraduate and graduate programs in physical therapy, occupational therapy, physician assistant studies, communication sciences and disorders, and health science, in addition to related certification programs. The school is a member of the Association of Schools of Allied Health Professionals.

The School of Social Work and Behavioral Sciences offers undergraduate degrees in psychology, rehabilitation and disability studies, and human services and professional graduate programs in social work, psychology, counseling, and student affairs administration.

Springfield College offers bachelor's degree completion programs and master's degrees in human services, business, education, and counseling that are geared toward working adult students at its four regional campuses, its main campus, and online.

The college is accredited by the New England Commission of Higher Education (NECHE).

Campuses
Springfield College consists of one main campus, located in Springfield, Mass., and two regional campuses in Boston and Houston.

The main campus spans  and contains ten residence halls, recreational and fitness facilities, science and academic facilities, a performing arts center, and the Richard B. Flynn Campus Union, which includes a food court, activity and lounge space, and College bookstore.

Springfield College's East Campus, which encompasses  of forest ecosystem, is located about one mile from the main campus. This location provides rustic facilities for conferences and meetings, and space for outdoor research and recreation. East Campus is also home to the Springfield College Child Development Center, which provides early education services for children of members of the faculty and staff, students, and families in the community.

Athletics
Springfield College's athletic teams have been known since 1995 as the Pride; the teams were nicknamed the Chiefs from 1968 through 1994, and prior to that were known as the Gymnasts or Maroons. The college is a member of National Collegiate Athletic Association (NCAA) Division III and most teams compete in the New England Women's and Men's Athletic Conference (NEWMAC).  Springfield's football team joined the NEWMAC when it began sponsoring football in 2017. The men's soccer, men's golf, cross country and gymnastics teams are affiliate members of the Eastern College Athletic Conference (ECAC). The men's volleyball team competes as an independent.

Springfield College is known as the "Birthplace of Basketball", a game created by alumnus and faculty member James Naismith under the founding head of the Physical Education department Luther Gulick Jr. in 1891. Gulick is in the Naismith Memorial Basketball Hall of Fame, which is named for Naismith.

Alumnus William G. Morgan invented the game of volleyball.

Stagg Field serves as the college's main athletic field; it was named after former coach, Amos Alonzo Stagg who briefly coached Springfield and went on to play a pivotal role in the development of modern football. The baseball team plays at Berry-Allen Field.

The Springfield softball team appeared in one Women's College World Series in 1977.

The Springfield College women's gymnastics team won the first intercollegiate national championship in 1969 and three of the first four (1971 and 1972).

In 1940 Springfield was one of eight teams to make the 1940 NCAA basketball tournament, losing to eventual champion Indiana 48–24 in the regional semifinals held at Butler Fieldhouse in Indianapolis, Indiana.

In 2006 and 2007, the school hosted the NCAA Division III Women's Basketball Final Four.

The men's volleyball team has six non-NCAA national titles in the now-defunct Molten Invitational championship, an event for NCAA Division III schools that ran from 1997 through 2011, and also won the first three NCAA Division III Men's Volleyball Championships in 2012 through 2014. All nine championships were won under Head Coach Charlie Sullivan.

The Springfield College Women's Basketball team of 2004–2005, made the Elite Eight of the NCAA Division III basketball tournament.

Women's basketball has won several conference tournament championships, including the season of 2006.

Springfield College graduates Rusty Jones G '86 and Jon Torine '95 participated in Super Bowl XLI as the Head Strength and Conditioning coaches of the Chicago Bears and Indianapolis Colts, respectively.

The Springfield College Women's Field Hockey Team has won the NEWMAC (New England Women's and Men's Athletic Conference) title for five consecutive years (2004–2008).

The men's lacrosse team won six straight titles (2008–2013) in the now-defunct Pilgrim Lacrosse League, which has since been absorbed by the NEWMAC.

Springfield's Women's Swimming and Diving Team has won the NEWMAC Conference title for ten consecutive years (2001–2010) in the Division III Conference.

Springfield's Men's soccer team were voted National College Champions by the Intercollegiate Soccer Football Association in 1946, 1947 and 1957. This was before the NCAA championship soccer tournament in 1959.

Rankings 
U.S. News & World Report ranked Springfield College #26 for Best Regional Universities—North Region for 2021, the sixth consecutive year that it has been in the top 30. U.S. News also ranked Springfield College #18 among Best Value Schools for Regional Universities—North, the school's fifth consecutive year on the list. This ranking takes into account a college's academic quality and net cost of attendance.

Springfield College is the recipient of the 2016 Presidential Award in the education category of the President's Higher Education Community Service Honor Roll. This honor is the highest federal recognition a college or university can receive for its commitment to volunteering, service-learning, and civic engagement.

Since 2009, Diverse Issues in Higher Education has ranked Springfield College's School of Professional and Continuing Studies, formerly the School of Human Services, among the top three U.S. institutions for the number of bachelor's degrees awarded to African Americans in public administration and social services.

The Carnegie Foundation recognized Springfield College as one of a select group of colleges and universities throughout the U.S. that have earned the foundation's Community Engagement Classification in 2015.

Affiliated Chambers of Commerce of Greater Springfield's (ACCGS) awarded Springfield College a 2014 Super 60 Award for revenue for the tenth consecutive year.

The Corporation for National and Community Service (CNCS) named Springfield  a finalist for the President's Award for Community Service in 2014.

Springfield College was named a 2016–17 College of Distinction for providing an innovative, teacher-centered undergraduate education with a strong record of preparing its graduates for real-world success.

U.S. News ranked Springfield College #8 for schools with the highest percentages of alumni enrolling in a graduate school in 2013.

Notable alumni and faculty 
 Harold Amos – microbiologist and professor
 Mark Banker – safeties coach for the Washington State Cougars football team
 Stanley F. Battle – American educator, author, civic activist and former leader of North Carolina Agricultural and Technical State University, Coppin State University and Southern Connecticut State University, 1973
 Vaughn Blanchard, 1912 Olympian in Track and Field and Baseball
 Rick Blangiardi, 15th mayor of Honolulu and former television executive
 Jeff Blatnick – 1984 Olympic gold medalist in Greco-Roman wrestling, 2015 UFC Hall of Fame inductee
 Raymond Castellani – did not graduate; actor, activist on Los Angeles' Skid Row
 John Cena – professional wrestler and film and TV actor
 Nancy Darsch – Collegiate, Olympic, and WNBA coach
 Tony DiCicco – head coach of USA Women's Soccer National Team 1994–1999, coach of the FIFA Women's Soccer 1999 Championship Team
 W. Dean Eastman – educator (graduate assistant track coach 1974–76, MSE 1976, CAGS 1977)
 John Forslund – TV play-by-play announcer for the Seattle Kraken of the NHL
 Nancy E. Gary –  (ScB 1958) dean of Albany Medical College and Executive Vice President of the Uniformed Services University of the Health Sciences and Dean of its F. Edward Hébert School of Medicine.
 Dave Gettleman – pro football executive, currently General Manager of the New York Giants
 Wayne Granger – former Major League Baseball relief pitcher and National League saves leader in 1970
 Don Ho – Hawaiian musician and entertainer (attended for one year)
Dan Hunt – head football coach at Colgate University
 Rusty Jones, strength and conditioning coach for the Chicago Bears
Dr. Lynn Lashbrook, President and Founder of SMWW
 William G. Morgan – inventor of volleyball.
 James Naismith – Canadian faculty member, invented basketball in 1891
 Max Nacewicz – Professional Football Player
 Erin Pac – bronze medal winner in bobsled at the 2010 Vancouver Olympics
 Boris Pash – commanded the Alsos Mission during World War II.
 Fernando Picó - historian, expert on the history of Puerto Rico
 Albert I. Prettyman – head coach of the United States Hockey Team at the Winter Olympics in Garmisch-Partenkirchen, Germany
 John Quinlan – model and actor, former professional wrestler
 Manuel Rivera-Ortiz – did not graduate; documentary photographer; attended classes at Springfield Colleges as part of the Massachusetts Migrant Education summer program, where he was offered his first courses in photography and film development.
Angela Salem – professional soccer player.
 Craig Shirley – political consultant and author, associated with Ronald Reagan
 Justine Siegal – baseball coach and sports educator.
 Steve Spagnuolo – former head coach of the National Football League's St. Louis Rams
 Amos Alonzo Stagg – head football coach 1890–1891; later head of multiple national champion teams at the University of Chicago. 
 Sue Thomas —  the first deaf person to work as an undercover specialist doing lip-reading of suspects for the Federal Bureau of Investigation
 Tom Waddell – alumnus, physician and founder of Gay Games
 Glenn Warner – president of National Soccer Coaches Association of America in 1953, head coach of the Naval Academy's men's soccer team from 1942 to 1975
 Scotty Whitelaw - former Commissioner of the Eastern College Athletic Conference
 Mike Woicik – football coach (1978–79) and strength and conditioning coach for several professional football teams
 Bill Yorzyk – physician and only USA swimming gold medalist in 1956 Olympics, 200 m butterfly
 Ted Shawn – Adjunct faculty member (1932-1933); founder of the Denishawn Dance School and Jacob's Pillow Dance Festival and a key figure in establishing male modern dance.
Peter V. Karpovich – Professor of physiology (1927-1947), director of health education (1947-1955), research professor of physiology (1955-1969); founder of the American College of Sports Medicine (ACSM).

References

External links

 
 Official athletics website

 
Universities and colleges founded by the YMCA
Universities and colleges in Springfield, Massachusetts
Educational institutions established in 1885
1885 establishments in Massachusetts
Private universities and colleges in Massachusetts